Shankarsheth Road may refer to:

 Shankarsheth Road, Mumbai
 Shankarsheth Road, Pune